Michael C. Turnesa (June 9, 1907 – October 31, 2000) was one of seven golfing brothers: Phil (1896–1987), Frank (1898–1949), Joe (1901–1991), Mike (1907–2000), Doug (1909–1972), Jim (1912–1971), and Willie (1914–2001). All but Willie turned professional. The family was referred to as a "golf dynasty" in a 2000 New York Times article.

Turnesa's first job in golf came in the pro shop at the Metropolis Country Club. He then became assistant professional at Innwood in the late 1920s before being named "playing professional" representing Fairview in 1931. All told, Mike played on PGA Tour for 18 years, winning six times, before settling down at Knollwood Country Club. He won the 1933 and 1941 Westchester Opens, and the 1949 Metropolitan PGA at Ardsley, but is better known for having finished second to Ben Hogan in both the 1948 PGA Championship and the 1942 Hale America Tournament, the war-time substitute for the U.S. Open. Mike also played in the inaugural Masters Tournament in 1934 along with brother Joe.

Turnesa's grandson, Marc Turnesa, has won on the Nationwide Tour and the PGA Tour.

Professional wins

PGA Tour wins (6)
1931 Mid-South Open
1932 three wins
1933 Westchester Open
1941 Westchester Open

Other wins
1942 Westchester PGA Championship
1947 Westchester PGA Championship
1949 Metropolitan PGA Championship

See also
List of golfers with most PGA Tour wins

References

American male golfers
PGA Tour golfers
Golfers from New York (state)
People from Westchester County, New York
1907 births
2000 deaths